Mahenur Haider is a Pakistani actress and model. She is known for her role in drama Aulaad. She is best known for her roles in movie Parchi as Natasha and in movie Teefa in Trouble as Sara. She runs her fashion brand called Zyre.

Early life
Mahenur was born in 1995 on 14 September in Lahore, Pakistan. She completed her studies from Beaconhouse National University, she graduated with a degree in Visual Communication Design.

Career
She also did theatre at school, she did stage performance in 2011 for Umair Ashfaq's play, The Will at Lahore's famous Alhamra Arts Council she played the role of a Sikh woman named Aishwariya and after that she did a second play which was a Frankengujjar and was directed by Subhan Ahmad Bhutta. Mahenur first started modeling at age 17.

She first did her fashion shoot for Bareezé. For five years she did modeling for brands such as Khaadi, Nishat Linen, Maria B, Kayseria, Alkaram Studio, Beechtree, Charizma, Chen One, Clive Shoes, Limelight, Rang Ja, Rungrez, Shoe Planet and The Closet. She was also model for skincare brand and Conatural.

Mahenur later decided to do TV commercials and editorials. In 2016 she appeared in Jal’s music video for Layian Layian opposite Goher Mumtaz.

In 2018 she made her debuted in films with Imran Kazmi's Parchi, directed by Azfar Jafri. The film came out to be a blockbuster with Mahenur role of Natasha received positively reviews in newspapers and magazines.
 
The same year in July she appeared in flim Teefa in Trouble her role was of Sara. The film was directed by Ahsan Rahim and had an ensemble cast of Ali Zafar, Maya Ali, Jawed Sheikh, Faisal Qureshi and Simi Raheal. Teefa in Trouble became one of the highest grossing films in the country her role was met with positive reviews.

In 2019, she appeared in the Strings music video for Raat Shabnami. The music video along with her performance garnered media attention and applaud.

In 2020 she was given the role of Muskaan in drama Aulaad aired on ARY Digital which she accepted. She also appeared in music video So Long, Goodbye by Danyal Zafar brother of Ali Zafar. The following year she appeared in film Naseeba with Mohsin Abbas Haider.

Personal life
She is married to a businessman Zarrar Mustapha, they both married on 4th April 2018. She is fluent in three languages which includes English, Urdu and Punjabi and loves Urdu poetry.

Filmography

Television

Film

Music videos

References

External links
 
 
 
 

1995 births
Living people
Pakistani television actresses
21st-century Pakistani actresses
Pakistani film actresses